Nachiyarpuram is an Indian Tamil language drama aired on Zee Tamil network and on their official ZEE5 platform. It premiered on 8 July 2019 from Monday to Saturday. Then It was rescheduled from Monday to Friday. The series stars the real-life couple Rachitha Mahalakshmi and Dinesh Gopalsamy. Due COVID-19 pandemic, this series was ended with final Episode-218 on Zee Tamil.

Synopsis
Jyothi and Karthi, fall in love with each other. But their family were separated in past as Jyothi's aunt Jayalakshmi marries a man Natarajan against her family, she is none other than Karthi's mother. How Jyothi and Karthi marries against their families forms crux of the story.

Cast

Main

Recurring

Casting
Saravanan Meenatchi fame Rachitha Mahalakshmi and Poove Poochudava fame Dinesh Gopalsamy, the real life couple plays the lead roles. They both joins second time in television fiction after Pirivom Santhippom  TV series. Actress Vadivukkarasi plays a negative role, where Girish, Deepa Nethran, Premi Venkat, Bharathi Mohan, Deepa Shankar, Venkat Subha, Farina and Rhema plays supporting roles.

References

External links
 

Zee Tamil original programming
Tamil-language romance television series
2019 Tamil-language television series debuts
Tamil-language television shows
2020 Tamil-language television series endings
Television shows set in Tamil Nadu